Fagan is a Norman-Irish surname. 

Fagan may also refer to:
 Fagan (saint), second century Welsh bishop and saint
 Fagan, Kentucky, United States, an unincorporated community
 Mount Fagan, South Georgia Island

See also
 St Fagans, Cardiff, Wales
 Battle of St Fagans, a 1648 battle in the Second English Civil War
 Fagan Commission, a commission set up by the South African government in 1948 to examine segregation
 Fagan inspection, a software inspection process
 Fagan v. Metropolitan Police Commissioner, a court case in England
 Fagin (disambiguation)
 Fagen (disambiguation)